The Haunted Science is the second album released by Omni Trio, the drum and bass moniker of English producer Robert Haigh. Similar to its predecessor The Deepest Cut, the album was first issued through the label Moving Shadow in the UK, then released in the US through Sm:)e Communications with new artwork, and then issued through Avex Trax in Japan with a bonus mini CD that contains four bonus tracks and new art. The Moving Shadow double LP lacks the alternative mixes of "Trippin' On Broken Beats", "Nu Birth Of Cool", and "Who Are You?" Those three tracks were also previously released as 12" singles.

The booking agency Haunted Science took their name from this album.

Track listing

Release history

References

External links
 

1996 albums
Rob Haigh albums